"Where Did I Go Wrong" is a song written and recorded by American country music artist Steve Wariner.  It was released in January 1989 as the first single from the album I Got Dreams.  It was Wariner's eighth number-one country single, spending one week at the top of the chart during a fourteen-week chart run.

Chart performance

Year-end charts

References

1989 singles
Steve Wariner songs
Songs written by Steve Wariner
Song recordings produced by Jimmy Bowen
MCA Records singles
1989 songs